Cock's peculiar tumour is a sebaceous cyst linked growth that can resemble a squamous cell carcinoma. The name is given after a 19th-century English surgeon Edward Cock. The proliferating cyst is usually solitary, but it often arises from a simple trichilemmal cysts in the hair follicle epithelium and these are multiple in 70% of cases. They are most commonly found on the scalp where the proliferating trichilemmal cyst will grow to a large size and ulcerate. Chronic inflammation can cause the cyst to take the form of a granuloma. This granuloma mimics a squamous-cell carcinoma (both clinically and histologically) and these ulcerating solitary cysts are called Cock's peculiar tumour.

Chronic inflammation causes the cyst to take the form of a granuloma. This granuloma mimics a squamous cell tumour. The most common sites are the ones where one can find hairs. These are, scalp and scrotum.

References

Integumentary neoplasia